Behnam Taebi is a Dutch-Iranian ethicist and academician who is known for his research at the interface of Ethics and Nuclear Energy. He is currently an Associate Professor in ethics of technology at Delft University of Technology, and Associate with the Kennedy School's Belfer Center for Science and International Affairs at Harvard University. In 2016, Taebi has been appointed to the Young Academy at the Royal Netherlands Academy of Arts and Sciences.

Background
Taebi studied Material Science and Engineering (2006) and received his Ph.D. in Philosophy of Technology (2010) at TU Delft in the Netherlands. He went to Harvard University in the US to perform his post-doctorate research where he established a firm tie with American research institute in ethical technology. His research interests are in energy ethics, nuclear ethics, responsible research and innovation (RRI) and engineering ethics. Taebi has finished a Veni project (2014-2018) and he is currently working on a joint RRI project on understanding controversies in energy technologies (both projects awarded by the Netherlands Organization for Scientific Research).

Academic career and coverage
His work around the safety and ethical aspects of nuclear energy technology and systems or his contribution in critical nuclear debates have been extensively covered by media outlet in the USA such as New York Times, Huffington Post, Newsweek, Reuters, and academic media such as National Interest  and Thomson Reuters Foundation and Carnegie Council  and also in the Netherlands media.

Publication
In addition to scholarly articles Taebi published within the ethics and technology, he authored the book 'The Ethics of Nuclear Energy Risk, Justice, and Democracy in the Post-Fukushima Era' published by Cambridge University Press, later became known as a standard text within the field.
Taebi is also the author of 'The Morally Desirable Option for Nuclear Power Production (2011)' and the editor of several volumes, including 'The Socio-Technical Challenges of Nuclear Power Production and Waste Management (2015)'  and also a co-author for 'Responsible Innovation in Energy Projects: Values in the Design of Technologies, Institutions and Stakeholder Interactions (2015)'.

See also
Ethics of technology
Digital ethics
Engineering ethics
Philosophy of technology

External links
 Personal page

References

Dutch ethicists
Academic staff of the Delft University of Technology
Delft University of Technology alumni
21st-century Dutch scientists
Living people
Year of birth missing (living people)
Philosophers of technology